Mirrors is a Canadian short drama film, directed by Étienne Desrosiers and released in 2007. The film stars Xavier Dolan as Julien, a shy and withdrawn teenager who is spending the summer with his family at a lake cottage, and experiences a sexual awakening when he develops a romantic interest in older neighbour Hervé (Stéphane Demers).

The cast also includes André Nadeau and Julie Beauchemin as Julien's parents, Maxime Allaire as his younger brother Antoine, and Patrick Martin as a teenage boy, never named, who is a rival for Hervé's affections.

The film was labelled as Dolan's breakthrough acting role as an adult, after having previously performed exclusively in children's roles.

The film was subsequently included in Bad Romance, the seventh edition of the Boys on Film series of gay-themed short film DVDs, and as a bonus feature on the DVD release of Dolan's directoral debut film I Killed My Mother (J'ai tué ma mère).

References

External links

2007 films
2007 short films
2007 LGBT-related films
Canadian coming-of-age drama films
Canadian LGBT-related short films
LGBT-related coming-of-age films
Gay-related films
French-language Canadian films
Canadian drama short films
2000s Canadian films